Old Viewforth is a municipal facility on Pitt Terrace in Stirling, Scotland. The facility, which is the headquarters of Stirling Council, is a Category B listed building.

History
The first house on the site, which was known as "Viewforth" was commissioned by the Rev John McMillan, Moderator of the Reformed Presbyterian Church of Scotland, in 1787. The building was acquired by Peter Drummond, a seed merchant, who demolished the old house in 1853. The earliest part of the current building, which was designed by John Hay in the Scottish baronial style, was built for Drummond and completed in 1855. The design involved an asymmetrical main frontage with four bays facing St Ninian's Road; it featured a stone porch, supported by polished columns, on the ground floor with coat of arms and finial above; there was a narrow oriel window on the first floor and a bartizan on the left corner. It was remodeled in 1871 and acquired by Stirlingshire County Council in 1931.

A large extension, extending the building eastwards to a design by James Miller in an art deco style in order the create additional administrative facilities for the county council, was added in 1937. The design for the extension involved an asymmetrical main frontage with eighteen bays facing south; the central section of three sections featured a doorway with an iron surround on the ground floor flanked by windows and full-height pilasters with a coat of arms above; there were windows on the first floor with a block pediment and frieze above. Statues of William Wallace and Robert the Bruce were erected on either side of the doorway. The principal room was the council chamber which jutted out to the north of the extension.

The complex became the headquarters for the wider Central Regional Council when it was created in May 1975. Following the reorganisation under the Local Government etc (Scotland) Act 1994, which saw the abolition of the district councils in the area, the building became the headquarters of the new Stirling Council in 1996.

A modern building known as "New Viewforth", designed in the Brutalist style, was constructed to the south of Old Viewforth and officially opened on 29 February 1972 but, after it became apparent that refurbishment would be uneconomic, it was demolished in 2014. In February 2020 the council announced that, although the council's main building at Old Viewforth was being retained, a section of land on the east of the site would be marketed for sale as part of plans for the Viewforth Link Road.

See also
 List of listed buildings in Stirling, Stirling

Notes

References

Old Viewforth
Government buildings completed in 1855
1855 establishments in Scotland
Buildings and structures in Stirling (city)
Category B listed buildings in Stirling (council area)
Listed government buildings in Scotland
County halls in Scotland